The Japan Ground Self-Defense Force, also referred to as the Japanese Army, is the land warfare branch of the Japan Self-Defense Forces. Created on July 1, 1954, it is the largest of the three service branches.

New military guidelines, announced in December 2010, direct the Japan Self-Defense Forces away from their Cold War focus on the Soviet Union to a new focus on China, especially in respect of the dispute over the Senkaku Islands.

The JGSDF operates under the command of the chief of the ground staff, based in the city of Ichigaya, Shinjuku, Tokyo. The present chief of staff is General Yoshihide Yoshida. The JGSDF numbered 150,700 soldiers in 2021.

History

20th century
Soon after the end of the Pacific War in 1945 with Japan accepting the Potsdam Declaration, the Imperial Japanese Army and Imperial Japanese Navy were dismantled by the orders of Supreme Commander for the Allied Powers (SCAP). Both were replaced by the United States Armed Forces occupation force, which assumed responsibility for the external defense of Japan.

Douglas MacArthur insisted that Japan have no military that could be used to settle international disputes or even for its own self defense. Accordingly, during the development of the Japan Constitution in 1946, Article 9 was added stating "the Japanese people forever renounce war as a sovereign right of the nation and the threat or use of force as means of settling international disputes." "In order to accomplish the aim of the preceding paragraph, land, sea, and air forces, as well as other war potential, will never be maintained. The right of belligerency of the state will not be recognized." It is believed that the Special Diet Session leader Hitoshi Ashida added the clause “In order to accomplish the aim of the preceding paragraph” in the middle of Article 9. The intent of this phrasing was to allow for the creation of military forces in Japan which would be for the defense of Japan, and not for settling international disputes. Then Prime Minister Shigeru Yoshida accepted this wording and was able to convince the US to allow Japan to operate "self defense" forces.

Under the terms of the Treaty of Mutual Cooperation and Security between the United States and Japan, United States forces stationed in Japan were to deal with external aggression against Japan while Japanese forces, both ground and maritime, would deal with internal threats and natural disasters. Only after the outbreak of the Korean War did MacArthur authorise Prime Minister Shigeru Yoshida to establish a 75,000 strong National Police Reserve. The next expansion came in 1952, when as a compromise in the face of U.S. calls to build up an army of 350,000, the National Police Reserve was re-titled the National Safety Force and expanded to 110,000.

In 1954, Prime Minister Yoshida impelled the Diet to accept the Defence Agency Establishment and the Self-Defence Force Laws, which explicitly authorized the forces to ‘defend Japan against direct and indirect aggression, and when necessary to maintain public order.’ On July 1, 1954, the National Security Board was reorganized as the Defense Agency, and the National Security Force was reorganized afterwards as the Japan Ground Self-Defense Force (Army), the Japan Maritime Self-Defense Force (Navy) and the Japan Air Self-Defense Force (Air Force), with General Keizō Hayashi appointed as the first Chairman of Joint Staff Council—professional head of the three branches. The enabling legislation for this was the 1954 Self-Defense Forces Act [Act No. 165 of 1954].

That year the actual strength of the Ground, Maritime and Air Self-Defence Forces reached 146,285, armed mainly with U.S. World War II vintage equipment. At least up until the 1970s, the Ground SDF was not built up to the point required to defeat an invasion attempt from the north – informed officials estimated that while ammunition provisions were officially said to be enough to last for two months, in actuality it would be used up in a week or less.

During the 1970s, the Japan Ground Self-Defense Force possessed a dubious ability to hold off a Soviet invasion of Hokkaido. Zbigniew Brzezinski observed in 1972 that it seemed optimized to fight "a Soviet invasion conducted on American patterns of a quarter of a century ago." Three years later in 1975, Osamu Kaihara, the former secretary of the National Defence Council, was reported in U.S. News & World Report that the SDF would have been totally ineffective in any Soviet attack, as the Ground SDF could only fight as an army for three to four days. While the force is now an efficient army of around 150,000, its apparent importance had, until recently, seemingly declined with the end of the Cold War, and attempts to reorient the forces as a whole to new post Cold War missions have been tangled in a series of internal political disputes.

21st century
On March 27, 2004, the Japan Defense Agency activated the Special Operations Group with the mandate under the JGSDF as its Counter-terrorist unit.

In 2015, the Japanese Diet passed a law that allowed for the reinterpretation of Article 9 of the constitution. JSDF personnel train with the American forces in amphibious assault units designed to take outlying islands.

Japan activated its first marine unit since World War II on April 7, 2018. The marines of the Amphibious Rapid Deployment Brigade are trained to counter invaders from occupying Japanese islands along the edge of the East China Sea.

British troops of the Honourable Artillery Company (HAC) exercised together for the first time with Japanese GSDF soldiers in Oyama, Shizuoka prefecture on 2 October 2018. This also marked the first time in history that foreign soldiers other than Americans exercised on Japanese soil. The purpose was to improve their strategic partnership and security cooperation. Speaking about tensions regarding North Korea, Lieutenant General Patrick Sanders said that Japan "won't have to fight alone."

The JGSDF and the Indian Army conducted their first joint military exercise in the Indian state of Mizoram from 27 October to 18 November 2018. It primarily consisted of anti-terror drills and improving bilateral cooperation with 60 Japanese and Indian officers.

In March 2019, the Ministry of Defense established its first regional cyber protection unit in the Western Army of the Japan Ground Self-Defense Force (JGSDF) to safeguard defense communications from cyber attacks, such as for personnel deployed on remote islands with no established secure lines.

The Japanese government approved the first ever JSDF dispatch to a peacekeeping operation that is not led by the United Nations in 2019. JGSDF officers monitored the cease-fire between Israel and Egypt at the Multinational Force and Observers command in the Sinai peninsula from 19 April until 30 November 2019.

From September to the end of November 2021, the GSDF conducted nationwide drills with all units including 100,000 personnel, 20,000 vehicles, 120 aircraft and the JMSDF and JASDF as well as a U.S. Army landing ship. These were the largest GSDF exercises since after the Cold War in 1993. The exercises are based on 2019 National Defense Program Guidelines to strengthen defense capabilities. Minister of Defense Nobuo Kishi said it is to effectively respond to various situations.

Current deployment

Personnel

In 1989, basic training for lower-secondary and upper-secondary academy graduates began in the training brigade and lasted approximately three months. Specialized enlisted and non-commissioned officer (NCO) candidate courses were available in branch schools and qualified NCOs could enter an eight-to-twelve-week officer candidate program. Senior NCOs and graduates of an eighty-week NCO pilot course were eligible to enter officer candidate schools, as were graduates of the National Defense Academy at Yokosuka and graduates of all four-year universities. Advanced technical, flight, medical and command and staff officer courses were also run by the JGSDF. Like the maritime and air forces, the JGSDF ran a youth cadet program offering technical training to lower-secondary school graduates below military age in return for a promise of enlistment.

Because of population density and urbanization on the Japanese islands, only limited areas are available for large-scale training, and, even in these areas, noise restrictions are extensive. The JGSDF has adapted to these conditions by conducting command post exercises, map manoeuvres, investing in simulators and other training programs, as well as conducting live fire exercises overseas at locations such as the Yakima Training Center in the United States.

The JGSDF has two reserve components: the rapid-reaction reserve component (即応予備自衛官制度) and the main reserve component (一般予備自衛官制度). Members of the rapid-reaction component train 30 days a year. Members of the main reserve train five days a year. As of December 2007, there were 8,425 members of the rapid-reaction reserve component and 22,404 members of the main reserve component.

Equipment

Organisation

Major Command
   is headquartered in Nerima, Tokyo. It was reorganized from the Central Readiness Force on March 27, 2018. In wartime, it would take command of two to five armies.

Armies

  Northern Army, headquartered in Sapporo, Hokkaido
  North Eastern Army, headquartered in Sendai, Miyagi
  Eastern Army, headquartered in Asaka, Saitama
  Central Army, headquartered in Itami, Hyōgo
  Western Army, headquartered at Kumamoto, Kumamoto

Division
JGSDF currently has 9 active duty divisions (1 armored, 8 infantry)

  1st Division, in Nerima.
  2nd Division, in Asahikawa.
  3rd Division, in Itami.
  4th Division, in Kasuga.
  6th Division, in Higashine.
  7th Division (7th Armored division), in Chitose.
  8th Division, in Kumamoto.
  9th Division, in Aomori.
  10th Division, in Nagoya.

Brigade
the JGSDF currently has 8 combat brigades:
  1st Airborne Brigade, at Camp Narashino in Funabashi, Chiba Prefecture
  5th Brigade, at Camp Obihiro in Obihiro, responsible for the defense of North Eastern Hokkaidō
  11th Brigade, at Camp Makomanai in Sapporo, responsible for the defense of South Western Hokkaidō
  12th Brigade (Air Assault), at Camp Soumagahara in Shintō, responsible for the defense of Gunma, Nagano, Niigata and Tochigi prefectures.
  13th Brigade, in Kaita, responsible for the defense of the Chūgoku region.
  14th Brigade, in Zentsūji, responsible for the defense of Shikoku.
  15th Brigade, in Naha, responsible for the defense of Okinawa Prefecture
  Amphibious Rapid Deployment Brigade, at Camp Ainoura in Sasebo, Nagasaki; amphibious force equipped to deploy from ships, where needed.

JGSDF divisions and brigades are combined arms units with infantry, armored, and artillery units, combat support units and logistical support units. They are regionally independent and permanent entities. The divisions strength varies from 6,000 to 9,000 personnel. The brigades are smaller with 3,000 to 4,000 personnel.

The JGSDF currently has 9 combat support brigades:
 1st Artillery Brigade, at Camp Kita Chitose in Chitose, Hokkaido Prefecture
1st Helicopter Brigade, at Camp Kisarazu in Kisarazu, Chiba Prefecture
 1st Anti-Aircraft Artillery Brigade, at Camp Higashi in Chitose, Hokkaido Prefecture
 2nd Anti-Aircraft Artillery Brigade, at Camp Iizuka in Iizuka, Fukuoka Prefecture
 1st Engineer Brigade, at Camp Koga in Koga, Ibaraki Prefecture
 2nd Engineer Brigade, at Camp Funaoka in Shibata, Miyagi Prefecture
 3rd Engineer Brigade, at Camp Eniwa in Eniwa, Hokkaidō Prefecture
 4th Engineer Brigade, at Camp Okubo in Uji, Kyoto Prefecture
 5th Engineer Brigade, at Camp Ogōri in Ogōri, Fukuoka Prefecture

Other units
Other Units and Organizations
Material Control Command
Ground Research & Development Command
Signal Brigade
Military Police
Military Intelligence Command
Ground Staff College
Ground Officer Candidate School
Special Forces Group

Ranks

Commissioned officer ranks
The rank insignia of commissioned officers.

Other ranks
The rank insignia of non-commissioned officers and enlisted personnel.

Culture and traditions

Music and traditions
The Japan Ground Self-Defense Force dropped nearly all traditions associated with the former Imperial Japanese Army save for the march music tradition (Review March was the official march of the IJA and today's JGSDF). However the tradition of bugle call playing, a tradition left by the Imperial Army, has remained till the present. Each JGDSF formation has had a bugle platoon or company led by a Bugle Major.

Flag and insignia
The Imperial Japanese Army flag with symmetrical 16 rays and a 2:3 ratio was abolished in 1945. The Japan Self-Defense Forces (JSDF) and Japan Ground Self-Defense Force (JGSDF) use a significantly different variation of the Rising Sun Flag with red, white and gold colors. It has 8-rays and an 8:9 ratio. The edges of the rays are asymmetrical since they form angles at 19, 21, 26 and 24 degrees. It also has indentations for the yellow (golden) irregular triangles along the borders. The JSDF Rising Sun Flag was adopted by a law/order/decree published in the Official Gazette of June 30, 1954.

See also
Japan Self-Defense Forces
Japanese Iraq Reconstruction and Support Group
Military ranks and insignia of the Japan Self-Defense Forces
Ministry of Defense (Japan)
Maritime Operational Transport concept (Japan)
List of equipment of the Japan Ground Self-Defense Force

References

External links 

  
Globalsecurity.org JGSDF section
Number of Tanks and Major Artillery and Performance Specifications
Number of Major Aircraft and Performance Specifications
Guided Missile Specifications